The 2001 World Rally Championship was the 29th season of the FIA World Rally Championship (WRC). In a tightly contested year, Subaru's Richard Burns took his first and only drivers' world title, beating Ford's Colin McRae, Mitsubishi's Tommi Mäkinen and the defending champion Marcus Grönholm of Peugeot. Peugeot successfully defended their manufacturers' title.

Calendar

The 2001 championship was contested over fourteen rounds in Europe, Africa, South America and Oceania.

Teams and drivers

Non Manufacturer Entries

Super 1600 Championship entries

Results and standings

Scoring system
Points were awarded to the top ten classified finishers in each event.

Drivers' championship

Manufacturers' championship

JWRC Drivers' championship

Events

References

External links

 FIA World Rally Championship 2001 at ewrc-results.com

World Rally Championship
World Rally Championship seasons